Middelgrunden is a shoal in the Øresund, the strait that separates Denmark from Sweden.  It is the site of the Middelgrunden wind farm and the Middelgrundsfortet.

References

Øresund